George Whelan (6 May 1859 – 12 November 1938) was a South African sports shooter. He competed in three events at the 1912 Summer Olympics.

References

1859 births
1938 deaths
South African male sport shooters
Olympic shooters of South Africa
Shooters at the 1912 Summer Olympics
Sportspeople from Kandy
South African people of Sri Lankan descent